General Ryder may refer to:

Charles W. Ryder (1892–1960), U.S. Army major general 
Charles Wolcott Ryder Jr. (1920–2010), U.S. Army major general 
Donald J. Ryder (fl. 1970s–2010s), U.S. Army major general
William T. Ryder (1913–1992), U.S. Army brigadier general